"Ribbon of Darkness" is a song written by Gordon Lightfoot that was released in 1965 as a single by Marty Robbins.  The song was Robbins' eleventh number one on the U.S. country singles chart, where it spent one week at the top and a total of nineteen weeks on the chart.

Lightfoot's own version was released as single in 1965 and included in his 1966 debut album Lightfoot! and again for his 1975 compilation album Gord's Gold. The latter recording features the song in a medley with "I'm Not Sayin'", as does the live recording from Lightfoot's 1969 Sunday Concert album.

Other cover versions
In 1969, Connie Smith made the top 20 on the country chart with her version, peaking at #13.
Crystal Gayle sang the song in her first television appearance.  and she released as the first single from her twenty sixth studio album You Don't Know Me: Classic Country in 2019. Her first single in 16 years.
Jack Scott, 1950's rock 'n' roll legend, recorded the song for his 2015 release Way to Survive.
Canadian singer-songwriter Bruce Cockburn contributed a cover of the song to the 2003 tribute album Beautiful: A Tribute to Gordon Lightfoot.

Chart performance

Marty Robbins

Connie Smith

References

1965 singles
Marty Robbins songs
1969 singles
Connie Smith songs
Songs written by Gordon Lightfoot
United Artists Records singles
Columbia Records singles
1965 songs